Yirise is a melancholic Greek song that tells about someone who lost his girl, and who wants her to come back. In a dramatic way, the song describes that the singer is bitter and sad because of it, and that he is overcome by longing. The lyrics of the song are by Yianis Vellas. Both in Greece and on Cyprus the song is famous.

The refrain of the song is like this:
 
Γύρισε σε περιμένω γύρισε (Yirise, se perimeno, yirise)  come back, I am waiting for you, come back
Μίκρουλα μου κοπέλα (mikroula mou kopela) my little girl
έλα έλα έλα (ela, ela, ela) come on (3x)

There is also a Hebrew version of the song, Irissim, that was sung by Ofra Haza. The Hebrew version has quite a different meaning from the Greek one, but as far as the sound of the words are concerned, there is much similarity. Ofra sung the song together with the Greek singer Glykeria, and Ofra sung the Hebrew version, the refrain was sung by Ofra and Glykeria together in Hebrew, and Glykeria sung the Greek version of the song.

Greek songs
Year of song unknown
Songwriter unknown